Triarius is a genus of skeletonizing leaf beetles in the family Chrysomelidae. There are about seven described species in Triarius. They are found in North America and Mexico.

Species
These seven species belong to the genus Triarius:
 Triarius lividus (J. L. LeConte, 1884)
 Triarius melanolomatus (Blake, 1942)
 Triarius nigroflavus E. Riley, S. Clark & Gilbert, 2001
 Triarius pini
 Triarius texanus Clark & Anderson, 2019
 Triarius trivittatus Horn, 1893
 Triarius vittipennis (Horn, 1893)

References

Further reading

 
 
 

Galerucinae
Chrysomelidae genera
Taxa named by Martin Jacoby